Nowie may refer to:
Nowie, Victoria, Australia
Nowie, Poland